In probability theory, Rice's formula counts the average number of times an ergodic stationary process X(t) per unit time crosses a fixed level u. Adler and Taylor describe the result as "one of the most important results in the applications of smooth stochastic processes." The formula is often used in engineering.

History

The formula was published by Stephen O. Rice in 1944, having previously been discussed in his 1936 note entitled "Singing Transmission Lines."

Formula

Write Du for the number of times the ergodic stationary stochastic process x(t) takes the value u in a unit of time (i.e. t ∈ [0,1]). Then Rice's formula states that

where p(x,x') is the joint probability density of the x(t) and its mean-square derivative x'''(t).

If the process x(t) is a Gaussian process and u = 0 then the formula simplifies significantly to give

where ρ'' is the second derivative of the normalised autocorrelation of x(t) at 0.

Uses

Rice's formula can be used to approximate an excursion probability

as for large values of u'' the probability that there is a level crossing is approximately the probability of reaching that level.

References

Ergodic theory